The Campillos International Piano Competition (Spanish: Concurso Internacional de Piano de Campillos) is a Spanish annual professional piano competition held in Campillos, Málaga. It was founded in 2007.

Winners

References

Music competitions in Spain